The 52d Airlift Squadron is a Regular Component United States Air Force unit. Its currently assigned to the 19th Airlift Wing at Little Rock Air Force Base, Arkansas, but is based at Peterson Air Force Base, Colorado. There, the squadron flies and maintains aircraft with the Air Force Reserve's 302d Airlift Wing.

The 52d is additionally tasked with aerial firefighting using the Modular Airborne Fire Fighting System.

History

World War II
The squadron was first activated at Camp Williams, Wisconsin in June 1942 as the 52d Transport Squadron as the 63d Transport Group expanded from three to four squadrons.  A few weeks after it was organized, the unit became the 52d Troop Carrier Squadron.  It was equipped with various civilian and military versions of the Douglas DC-3, including the Douglas C-47 Skytrain and the C-53 Skytrooper.  The squadron acted as a Replacement Training Unit (RTU). RTUs were oversized units that trained individual pilots or aircrews for service in combat theaters.

The squadron moved its operations several times, arriving at Sedalia Army Air Field, Missouri in January 1944. However, the Army Air Forces was finding that standard military units, based on relatively inflexible tables of organization were not proving well adapted to the training mission.  Accordingly, it adopted a more functional system in which each base was organized into a separate numbered unit. The 52d was disbanded, and along with other units at Sedalia Army Air Field, was replaced by the 813th AAF Base Unit (Combat Crew Training School, Troop Carrier).

Air Force reserve
The squadron was reconstituted and reactivated at Floyd Bennett Field, New York in June 1949, when Continental Air Command reorganized its reserve units under the wing base organization system, which placed both operational and support organizations under a single wing.  Under the 1949 reserve plan, the squadron was manned at only 25% of its authorized strength. It trained with C-47s and a variety of trainer aircraft under the guidance of the regular 2230th Air Force Reserve Training Center.

Along with all reserve combat units, the squadron was mobilized for the Korean War. It was included in the second wave of reserve unit callups, entering active duty on 1 May 1951.  Its personnel were used as fillers for other units and the squadron was inactivated on 9 May.

Later operations
Worldwide Airlift, 1953–1969. Supported Project Deep Freeze in the Antarctic, 1956–1958. Worldwide airlift, 1988–1992 with Lockheed C-141 Starlifters, including airdrop of troops and equipment in Operation Just Cause in Panama on 20 December 1989. Redesignated as 52 Airlift Squadron on 1 January 1992. Inactivated on 30 September 1992. The squadron reactivated on 1 May 1994 in the tactical airlift role, 1994–1997. Inactivated on 16 September 1997.

Organization reactivated to duty on 3 October 2009 with C-130s as an active associate airlift squadron dually-assigned to the Air Force Reserve's 302d Airlift Wing at Peterson Air Force Base, Colorado. Participated in Operation Enduring Freedom, Afghanistan 23 Aug 2010 – present.

The squadron is assigned the aerial firefighting mission using Modular Airborne Fire Fighting Systems. The system can discharge its load of 3,000 gallons weighing 27,000 pounds in less than five seconds. The retardant can cover an area one-quarter of a mile long and 100 feet wide. After the plane discharges its load, it can be refilled on the ground in less than 12 minutes.

Lineage
 Constituted as the 52d Transport Squadron on 30 May 1942
 Activated on 15 June 1942
 Redesignated 52d Troop Carrier Squadron on 4 July 1942
 Disbanded on 14 April 1944
 Reconstituted and redesignated 52d Troop Carrier Squadron, Medium on 10 May 1949
 Activated in the reserve on 27 June 1949
 Ordered to active service on 1 May 1951
 Inactivated on 9 May 1951
 Redesignated 52d Troop Carrier Squadron, Heavy on 19 March 1953
 Activated on 20 June 1953
 Redesignated as: 52d Military Airlift Squadron on 8 January 1966
 Inactivated on 8 February 1969
 Activated on 1 June 1988
 Redesignated as 52d Airlift Squadron''' on 1 January 1992
 Inactivated on 30 September 1992
 Activated on 1 May 1994
 Inactivated on 27 September 1997
 Activated on 3 October 2009

Assignments

 63d Transport Group (later 63d Troop Carrier Group), 15 June 1942 – 14 April 1944
 63d Troop Carrier Group, 27 June 1949 – 9 May 1951
 63d Troop Carrier Group, 20 June 1953 (attached for operational control to 322d Air Division, c. 29 January-c. 1 August 1960 and c. January 1962)
 63d Troop Carrier Wing (later 63d Military Airlift) Wing), 18 January 1963 (remained under operational control of 322d Air Division)
 436th Military Airlift Wing, 8 January 1967 – 8 February 1969 (remained under operational control of 322d Air Division)
 63d Military Airlift Wing, 1 June 1988
 63d Operations Group, 1 January-30 September 1992
 347th Operations Group, 1 May 1994 – 1 April 1997
 19th Operations Group, 3 October 2009–present

Stations

 Camp Williams, Wisconsin, 15 June 1942
 Dodd Field, Texas, 17 September 1942
 Stuttgart Army Air Field, Arkansas, 18 November 1942
 Victorville Army Air Field, California, 25 December 1942
 Lawson Field, Georgia, 5 May 1943
 Grenada Army Air Field, Mississippi, 3 June 1943
 Sedalia Army Air Field, Missouri, c. 19 January- 14 April 1944
 Floyd Bennett Field, New York, 27 June 1949 – 9 May 1951
 Altus Air Force Base, Oklahoma, 20 June 1953
 Donaldson Air Force Base, South Carolina, 15 October 1953 (operated from Rhein-Main Air Base, Germany, 29 January-c. 1 August 1960 and after c. January 1962)
 Hunter Air Force Base, Georgia, 30 June 1963 (continued to operate from Rhein-Main Air Base)
 Dover Air Force Base, Delaware, 8 January 1967 – 8 February 1969 (continued to operate from Rhein-Main Air Base)
 Norton Air Force Base, California, 1 June 1988 – 30 September 1992
 Moody Air Force Base, Georgia, 1 May 1994 – 1 April 1997
 Peterson Air Force Base, Colorado, 3 October 2009 – 2015

Aircraft

 Douglas DC-3, 1942
 Douglas C-39, 1942
 Douglas C-53 Skytrooper, 1942–1943
 Douglas C-47 Skytrain, 1942–1944; 1949–1951
 North American T-6 Texan, 1949–1950
 Beechcraft T-7 Navigator, 1949–1951
 Beechcraft T-11 Kansan, 1949–1951
 Douglas C-124 Globemaster II, 1953–1969
 Lockheed C-141 Starlifter, 1988–1992
 Lockheed C-130E Hercules, 1994–1997
 Lockheed C-130H3 Hercules, 2009–present

References

Notes

Bibliography

 
 
 
 
 
 
 

052